Only Crime and Outbreak is a split EP by punk bands Only Crime and Outbreak. It was released on June 26, 2007.

Track listing
"Brand New Scene" – Only Crime – 2:35
"Revisionistic" – Only Crime – 2:49
"Single File" – Outbreak – 1:20
"Deaf and Blind" – Outbreak – 1:42

Personnel

Only Crime
 Russ Rankin – vocals
 Zach Blair – guitar
 Aaron Dalbec – guitar
 Doni Blair – bass
 Bill Stevenson – drums

External links
Think Fast! Records page for Only Crime
Only Crime official website

2007 EPs
Only Crime albums
Think Fast! Records albums